Lucas de Ramos Silveira (born 3 January 2001), known as Lucas Ramos, is a Brazilian professional footballer who plays as a midfielder for Internacional.

Club career
Born in Sarandi, Rio Grande do Sul, Lucas Ramos was an Internacional youth graduate. On 24 November 2020, after being involved in first team trainings, he renewed his contract until 2024.

Lucas Ramos made his senior debut on 1 March 2021, starting in a 1–0 Campeonato Gaúcho home win over Juventude, as Internacional fielded an under-20 side to the match. Three days later he scored his first senior goal, netting his team's second in a 2–2 away draw against Pelotas.

On 10 March 2021, Lucas Ramos was definitely promoted to the main squad by manager Miguel Ángel Ramírez. He made his Série A debut on 20 June, starting in a 1–1 home draw against Ceará.

Career statistics

References

External links
Internacional profile 

2001 births
Living people
Sportspeople from Rio Grande do Sul
Brazilian footballers
Association football midfielders
Campeonato Brasileiro Série A players
Sport Club Internacional players